Mona Margaret McBurney (29 July 18624 December 1932) was a British pianist, teacher and composer who lived and worked in Australia.

Life
Mona McBurney was born in Douglas, Isle of Man, the youngest of six children of teacher and scholar Isaiah McBurney and art and music teacher Margaret McBurney. Mona studied music in Edinburgh with Sir Alexander Mackenzie, who was later a principal of the Royal Academy of Music.

The family emigrated to Victoria, Australia, in 1881, and settled in Geelong. McBurney attended the Ladies' College where her brother Samuel was principal and the University of Melbourne in 1881. In 1892 she continued her studies at the University of Melbourne as a music student with G.W.L. Marshall-Hall, graduating in 1896.

After ending her studies, McBurney worked as a composer and educator. In 1907 she conducted a women's orchestra in her Northern Ballad. In 1918 she took a position as an Italian and French teacher at the University of Melbourne Conservatorium, and in 1921 a position as Italian teacher at the Albert Street Conservatorium, working in both positions until her death in 1932.

McBurney was active in literary and music societies and in providing venues for young musicians and composers. She never married and died of pneumonia in Hawthorn, Melbourne.

Works
McBurney composed an opera, a concerto for piano and orchestra, a string quartet, two choral odes, a number of piano works and about thirty songs. Selected works include:
Ode to Dante, 1902
The Dalmatian, opera, libretto adapted from a popular novel by F. Marion Crawford, Marietta: A Maid of Venice, 1910.
Northern Ballad for orchestra, 1907
 String Quartette in G Minor
 Bardic Ode From Ossian
 Persian Song of Spring with 14th century lyrics by Hafiz
 To my Friends the Birds
 O Bella Italia, addio
 Shrine of Remembrance
 Waldtraut's Song from "Der wilde Jager" by Julius Wolff (writer)
 An Elizabethan Madrigal
 A mes amis, les oiseaux with lyrics by Jean Jacques Rousseau 
 Chansonnette on fifteen century French verse
 Song on May Morning 78rpm recording title 169939 at National Film Sound Archive
 Gavotte

References

1862 births
1932 deaths
19th-century classical composers
20th-century classical composers
Australian women classical composers
Australian music educators
Australian opera composers
British classical composers
British music educators
20th-century British composers
People from Douglas, Isle of Man
Deaths from pneumonia in Victoria (Australia)
19th-century British composers
Women music educators
University of Melbourne alumni
20th-century women composers
19th-century women composers